Bhavania is a small genus of loaches of the family Balitoridae.

Species
There is one species definitely assigned to this genus. The placement of B. arunachalensis within the family is uncertain.  It is currently included here pending further studies.
 Bhavania arunachalensis Nath, Dam, Bhutia, Dey & D. N. Das, 2007 (this species is species inquirenda and incertae sedis within Balitoridae)
 Bhavania australis (Jerdon, 1849) (Western Ghat loach)

References
 

Balitoridae
Fish of India